The Afghan–Iraqi Freedom Memorial is a war memorial installed on the Oregon Veterans' Building grounds, in Salem, Oregon, United States. The monument was dedicated in 2006.

See also
 2006 in art

References

External links

 

2006 establishments in Oregon
2006 sculptures
Afghanistan-Iraq War memorials
Fountains in Salem, Oregon
Monuments and memorials in Salem, Oregon
Outdoor sculptures in Salem, Oregon
Sculptures of men in Oregon
Statues in Oregon